Paul Leslie Rutherford (born 10 July 1987) is an English footballer who plays as a winger for Cymru Premier club Bala Town.

Career
Born in Moreton, Wirral, he was brought up through the ranks in Liverpool's academy with his brother John before joining Chester City.

In 2005, he signed his first professional contract after impressing in Chester City's Youth Team.

He made his First Team début for Chester City against Cambridge United in the Football League Trophy in 2005 and over the past few years has been involved in first–team duties. He scored his first league goal in the 2–1 win over Darlington on 22 March 2008.

Rutherford was part of the Barrow side who won the 2009-10 FA Trophy at Wembley against Stevenage Borough 2–1.

On 25 June 2013, Rutherford signed for Southport.

On 23 May 2016, Rutherford signed for Wrexham. He made his debut for the club on the opening day of the 2016–17 season, in a 0–0 draw with Dover Athletic, scoring his first goal for the club in their following match with a 93rd minute winning goal during a 3–2 victory over Guiseley.

On 2 June 2021, it was announced that Rutherford would leave Wrexham after spending 5 years at the club.

On 25 June 2021, Rutherford signed for Bala Town. He made his European debut in July 2021, as Bala lost 2-0 on aggregate to Larne in the Europa Conference League.

Career statistics

References

External links
Paul Rutherford Profile at BarrowAFC.com

Port Online Player Profile

1987 births
Living people
English footballers
Association football midfielders
Chester City F.C. players
Barrow A.F.C. players
Southport F.C. players
Wrexham A.F.C. players
Bala Town F.C. players
English Football League players
National League (English football) players
Cymru Premier players